Las voces de Huayra is the debut album by the Argentine singer Jorge Cafrune, released in Argentina in 1957.

Track listing 
"La Felipe Varela"
"Cholos y cholitas"
"Noche, noche"
"Coquita y alcohol"
"Al pie de un cardon"
"Vidala de la copla"
"La del disimulo"
"La estrellera"
"Villa de Villares"
"La maimareña"

1957 debut albums
Jorge Cafrune albums
Columbia Records albums
Spanish-language albums